-ussy is an English-language suffix derived from the word pussy. The suffix has existed within LGBT slang in the form bussy (boy pussy) since the early 2000s, but was popularized in the late 2010s and early 2020s on social media platforms including TikTok. It was named the American Dialect Society's word of the year for 2022.

History
The suffix originated within LGBT slang in the forms bussy (boy pussy) and mussy (man pussy), referring to a man's anus, with these forms first appearing on the internet between 1999 and 2004. An April 2017 Tumblr post popularized the suffix with the term thrussy (from throat), and it was further spread as part of the "one thicc bih" Internet meme that began to spread about a month later. A 2018 study of -ussy usage on Twitter as part of the meme identified 1,338 "pussy blends" used in tweets from June to August 2017.

Use of the suffix in forms other than bussy (also called -ussification) was popularized by TikTok users beginning in late 2021. This -ussification has been used to reference objects' cavities (e.g., a donut's ) as well as in a more figurative sense that denotes effort one can put into a role (a barista putting their "whole " into latte art). Rapper Lil Nas X also helped to popularize the suffix, advocating for the inclusion of bussy in the dictionary for Pride Month. The suffix was named the word of the year for 2022 by the American Dialect Society, with Ben Zimmer, the president of the society, stating that the selection "highlights how creativity in new word formation has been embraced online in venues like TikTok."

Michael Dow, a linguist at the Université de Montréal, wrote an article analyzing different uses of the suffix, such as the merging of "Margaret Thatcher" with "-ussy" to create the portmanteau "Thatchussy".

References

Sources
 

English suffixes
LGBT slang
2000s neologisms